Revelation 6 is the sixth chapter of the Book of Revelation or the Apocalypse of John in the New Testament of the Christian Bible. The book is traditionally attributed to John the Apostle, but the precise identity of the author remains a point of academic debate. This chapter describes the opening of the first six of the seven seals. The opening of the seventh seal is recorded in chapter 8. Four horses and their riders, the Four Horsemen of the Apocalypse, emerge as the first four seals are opened.

Text
The original text was written in Koine Greek. This chapter is divided into 17 verses.

Textual witnesses
Some early manuscripts containing the text of this chapter are among others:
Papyrus 115 (~AD 275; extant verses 5–6)
Codex Sinaiticus (330-360)
Codex Alexandrinus (400-440)
Codex Ephraemi Rescriptus (~450; complete)

The First Four Seals (6:1–8)

Verse 5
And when he had opened the third seal, I heard the third beast say, Come and see. And I beheld, and lo a black horse; and he that sat on him had a pair of balances in his hand.

Verse 6
 And I heard a voice in the midst of the four beasts say, A measure of wheat for a penny, and three measures of barley for a penny; and see thou hurt not the oil and the wine.
 "measure" (Greek: choinix or choenix) - that is, approximately one quart or 1.1 litres.
 "penny" (Greek: denarius) - this was approximately one day's wage for a worker.
 "a measure of wheat for a penny, and three measures of barley for a penny"
 "a choenix of wheat for a denarius, and three choenixes of barley for a denarius". 
The choenix appears to have been the food allotted to one man for a day; while the denarius was the pay of a soldier or of a common labourer for one day ("He agreed with the labourers for a penny a day," and Tacitus, 'Ann.,' 1:17, 26, "Ut denarius diurnum stipendium foret." Cf. Tobit 5:14, where drachma is equivalent to denarius). The choenix was the eighth part of the "modius", and a denarius would usually purchase a modius of wheat. The price given, therefore, denotes great scarcity, though not an entire absence of food, since a man's wages would barely suffice to obtain him food. Barley, which was the coarser food, was obtainable at one third of the price, which would allow a man to feed a family, though with difficulty.
 "And see thou hurt not the oil and the wine."
The corollary to the preceding sentence, with the same signification. It expresses a limit set to the power of the rider on the black horse. These were typical articles of food (cf. Wordsworth interprets, "The prohibition to the rider, 'Hurt not thou the oil and the wine,' is a restraint on the evil design of the rider, who would injure the spiritual oil and wine, that is, the means of grace, which had been typified under those symbols in ancient prophecy, and also by the words and acts of Christ, the good Samaritan, pouring in oil and wine into the wounds of the traveller, representing human nature, lying in the road." 'Αδικήσῃς ἀδικεῖν in the Revelation invariably signifies "to injure," and, except in one case, takes the direct accusative after it (see ; ;). Nevertheless, Heinrich and Elliott render, "Do not commit injustice in the matter of the oil and wine". Theologian H. W. Rinek renders, "waste not". The vision is a general prophecy of the future for all time (see on verse 5); but many writers have striven to identify the fulfilment of the vision with some one particular famine.

The Fifth Seal (6:9–11)

Verse 11
And white robes were given unto every one of them; and it was said unto them, that they should rest yet for a little season, until their fellowservants also and their brethren, that should be killed as they were, should be fulfilled.

The Sixth Seal (6:12–17)

Verse 12
 And I beheld when he had opened the sixth seal, and, lo, there was a great earthquake; and the sun became black as sackcloth of hair, and the moon became as blood;

See also
 Four Horsemen of the Apocalypse
 Jesus
 John's vision of the Son of Man
 Names and titles of Jesus in the New Testament
 Seven seals
 Related Bible parts: Revelation 5, Revelation 7, Revelation 8

Notes

References

Bibliography

External links
 King James Bible - Wikisource
English Translation with Parallel Latin Vulgate 
Online Bible at GospelHall.org (ESV, KJV, Darby, American Standard Version, Bible in Basic English)
Multiple bible versions at Bible Gateway (NKJV, NIV, NRSV etc.)

06
Four Horsemen of the Apocalypse